Sir Walter Scott (1771–1832) was a Scottish poet and novelist.

Walter Scott may also refer to:

Nobility 

 Walter Scott, 4th Baron of Buccleuch (1549–1574)
 Sir Walter Scott, 1st Lord Scott of Buccleuch (1565–1611), Scottish nobleman and border reiver
 Walter Scott, 1st Earl of Buccleuch (before 1606–1633), Scottish nobleman
 Sir Walter Scott of Branxholme and Buccleuch (c. 1495–1552), nobleman of the Scottish Borders
 Walter Scott, Earl of Tarras (1644–1693), Scottish nobleman
 Sir Walter Scott, 1st Baronet, of Beauclerc (1826–1910), English building contractor and publisher
 Walter Montagu Douglas Scott, 5th Duke of Buccleuch (1806–1884), British politician and nobleman
 Walter Montagu Douglas Scott, 8th Duke of Buccleuch (1894–1973), politician and Conservative peer

Sports people 
Walter Scott (Australian footballer) (1899–1989), Australian rules footballer for Norwood
Walter Scott (footballer, born 1886) (1886–1955), English footballer
Walter Scott (footballer, born 1932) (1932–1988), Scottish footballer for Dumbarton and Halifax Town
Walter Scott (soccer) (born 1999), Australian footballer
Walter Scott (American cricketer) (1864/68–1907), American cricketer for Philadelphia
Walter Scott (Australian cricketer) (1907–1989), Australian cricketer for Victoria
Walter Scott (South African cricketer) (1892–1963), South African cricketer for Border
Walter Scott (Scottish footballer) (fl. 1910–1914), Scottish footballer for Queen's Park
Wattie Scott, Scottish footballer

Entertainers 
Walter E. Scott (1872–1954), American performer and con man, also known as Death Valley Scotty
Walter Irving Scott (1895–1995), magician
Walter M. Scott (1906–1989), American set decorator
Walter Scott, one of the lead singers of the R&B/soul group The Whispers
Walter Scott (singer) (1943–1983), American singer
Walter Scott, the pen name of Lloyd Shearer, a gossip columnist

Politicians 
Walter Scott (Canadian politician) (1867–1938), first Premier of Saskatchewan
Walter K. Scott (1915–1977), United States Assistant Secretary of State for Administration
Walter Robert Scott (born 1943), New South Wales politician
Walter Scott (Northern Ireland politician) (1908–?), MP in the Northern Ireland Parliament for Belfast Bloomfield
Walter F. Scott (1856–1938), banker and politician who served as Vermont State Treasurer
Walter Scott (Queensland politician) (1844–1890), member of the Queensland Legislative Assembly
Walter A. Scott (1876–1963), mayor of Jackson, Mississippi

Clergymen 
Walter Quincy Scott (1845–1917), American Presbyterian minister, President of Ohio State University
Walter Scott (clergyman) (1796–1861), Christian evangelist for the Mahoning Baptist Association and a leader in the Campbell/Stone Restoration Movement

Businessmen 
Walter Scott, co-founder of the clothing brand Lyle & Scott
Sir Walter D. Scott (died 1981), Australian accountant, founder of the management consultancy firm WD Scott
Walter Dill Scott (businessman) (1931–2018), American business executive
Walter Scott Jr. (1931–2021), director of Berkshire Hathaway, chairman of Level 3 Communications
Walter Scott (investment manager) (born 1947), Scottish founder of Walter Scott and Partners

Others 
 Walter Dill Scott (1869–1955), American applied psychologist
 Walter Scott, pseudonymous columnist for Parade magazine (currently Edward Klein)
 Walter Scott Medal for Valor or Scott Medal, a medal awarded for bravery to Irish police officers
 Walter Scott (scholar) (1855–1925), English academic
 Walter Scott of Harden (died 1629), Border reiver
 Walter Stone Scott (1871–1948), American postage stamp auctioneer
 Walter Scott (educationalist) (1902–1985), New Zealand teacher, educationalist and civil libertarian

 Walter Lamar Scott (1965–2015), South Carolinian shot by a North Charleston police officer indicted in his murder
 Walter Jervoise Scott (1835–1890), grazier in Queensland, Australia

See also
SS Sir Walter Scott, an 1899 steamship on Loch Katrine, Scotland
Walter Scott of Buccleuch (disambiguation)
Walter Scott Prize

Scott, Walter